Sompolno  is a town in Konin County, Greater Poland Voivodeship, Poland, with 3,700 inhabitants (2004).

History
In the 10th century, the area became part of the emerging Polish state under its first historic ruler Mieszko I. In 1242, Duke Casimir I of Kuyavia from the Piast dynasty stayed in Sompolno, and issued a privilege for the Sulejów Abbey there. Sompolno was granted town rights in 1477. It was a royal town, administratively located in the Brześć Kujawski Voivodeship in the Greater Poland Province of the Kingdom of Poland.

During the German occupation of Poland (World War II), Sompolno was renamed to Deutscheck between 1939–1943 and then later to Deutscheneck between 1943–1945 in attempt to erase traces of Polish origin.

Sports
The local football club is GKS Sompolno. It competes in the lower leagues.

Gallery

References 

Cities and towns in Greater Poland Voivodeship
Konin County